"Connection" is a song by Britpop group Elastica. It was originally released on 10 October 1994 as a single and included on their self-titled debut album in 1995. The song debuted and peaked at number 17 on the UK Singles Chart and became one of the few Britpop songs to gain popularity in North America, reaching number 53 on the US Billboard Hot 100, number two on the Billboard Modern Rock Tracks chart, and number nine on the Canadian RPM Top Singles chart.

In an interview with Zane Lowe, Damon Albarn mentions playing the synthesizer intro on a Yamaha QY10 handheld sequencer.

The song was the subject of controversy due to its overt similarity to another band's work. The intro synthesizer part (later repeated as a guitar figure) is lifted from the guitar riff in Wire's "Three Girl Rhumba" and transposed down a semitone. A judgment resulted in an out-of-court settlement and the credits were rewritten. Jonathan Perry writing for The Phoenix noted the similarities to Wire. He included the song in a list of the 90 best songs of the 90s, writing: Connection', Elastica's obsessively catchy stateside breakthrough, nicked its signature opening riff from Wire's 'Three Girl Rhumba' – an overzealous (and uncredited) 'homage' that proved that though imitation may indeed be the highest form of flattery, it can also cost in publishing royalties. Great song, though."

The song is the theme to the UK television programme Trigger Happy TV. A live version of the song was featured on the MuchMusic live compilation album, Much at Edgefest '99. The song also appears in the 2019 film, Captain Marvel, which is set in 1995; in episode 8 of the 2018 Netflix series Everything Sucks!, the 2022 HBO Max movie Kimi and the Season 3 finale of the Apple TV Plus series For All Mankind.

Reception
Pitchfork said, "Elastica crafted one of the marvels of the Britpop era: art-rock reconfigured as a carnal rallying cry. All leftward hooks and innuendo, "Connection" never hits its target squarely. The single sounds simple, even primal, as Elastica bashes their dive-bomb riff with enthusiasm."

Track listings

UK CD and 12-inch single
 "Connection"
 "See That Animal"
 "Blue" (Donna's 4-track demo)
 "Spastica"

UK cassette and limited-edition 7-inch single
 "Connection"
 "See That Animal"

European and Australian CD single
 "Connection"
 "Rockunroll" (John Peel Session)
 "Annie" (John Peel Session)
 "See That Animal"

Charts

Weekly charts

Year-end charts

Release history

References

1994 singles
1994 songs
Elastica songs
Geffen Records singles
Songs written by Justine Frischmann